Trials Frontier is a platform racing video game developed by RedLynx and published by Ubisoft for iOS and Android in 2014. It is a spin-off of the Trials series designed to accompany Trials Fusion.

Reception

The iOS version received "mixed" reviews according to the review aggregation website Metacritic.

References

External links
 

2014 video games
Android (operating system) games
IOS games
Motorcycle video games
Racing video games
RedLynx games
Trials (series)
Ubisoft games
Video games developed in Finland